Christianity is the largest religion in Peru, with Roman Catholics having the most adherents. Religion in Peru is traditionally related to religious syncretism originating from Catholicism with the ancient Inca religion after the Spanish Conquest. However, Protestant churches of various denominations have developed considerably in the popular sectors over the past 30 years. There has been a slow but consistent advance of irreligion especially among young people in urban areas. Religions such as Judaism and Buddhism, and more recently Hinduism and Islam, are present due to immigration.

According to article 2 of the Peruvian Constitution: "Everyone has the right to freedom of conscience and religion, individually or in association. There is no persecution for reasons of ideas or beliefs. There is no crime of opinion. The public exercise of all confessions are free, as long as they do not offend morals or disturb public order."

Christianity

Roman Catholicism

History                               
The Spanish conquerors not only conquered Peru militarily, but also sought to convert the indigenous populations to Christianity. Indigenous Andean religious beliefs and practices persisted, which the Catholic Church sought to suppress. Many churches were built in the colonial period, the visible manifestation of Catholicism. Some convents were also built on Inca sites. For example, in 1605, some Dominican nuns built the Convent of Santa Catalina in Cuzco atop the site of the "acllahuasi", once home to virginal young women dedicated to serving the ruling Inca. Another convent, the Convent of Santa Clara, was one of the first institutions the conquistadores of Cuzco built for "Indian nobles", the daughters of the indigenous elite whose collaboration made Spain's indirect rule over the Andes possible. At Santa Clara, Inca nobles were to be "raised Christian and to receive 'buenas costumbres' (literally, good customs or manners), shorthand for an education in Spanishness", which included knowledge, stitchery, and literacy. After graduating from this course in Spanish culture, charges were free to profess vows or leave the convent. Miscegenation was not an issue among Spaniards. Many prominent Spanish men lived with elite Inca women, only to marry Spanish women later in life and marry off their Andean partners to less prominent Spaniards.

Modern era
The Peruvian government is closely allied with the Catholic Church. Article 50 of the Constitution recognizes the Catholic Church's role as "an important element in the historical, cultural, and moral development of the nation." Catholic clergy and laypersons receive state remuneration in addition to the stipends paid to them by the Church. This applies to the country's 52 bishops, as well as to some priests whose ministries are located in towns and villages along the borders. In addition each diocese receives a monthly institutional subsidy from the Government. An agreement signed with the Vatican in 1980 grants the Catholic Church special status in Peru. The Catholic Church receives preferential treatment in education, tax benefits, immigration of religious workers, and other areas, in accordance with the agreement. So Roman Catholicism could be considered the main religion of Peru. See also the following: Roman Catholicism in Peru with Partial list of Catholic universities in Peru; and Lord of Miracles, Peruvian religious festival.

Although the Constitution states that there is freedom of religion, the law mandates that all schools, public and private, impart religious education as part of the curriculum throughout the education process (primary and secondary). Catholicism is the only religion taught in public schools. In addition, Catholic religious symbols are found in all government buildings and public places.

According to the 2017 Census, there were 76% of the population 12+ identifying themselves as Catholics.

Protestantism
At the 2017 Census there were 14.1% of the population 12+ identifying themselves as Protestants, mainly Evangelicals. In Latin America most Protestants are called Evangelicos because most of them are Evangelical Protestants, while some are also traditional Mainline Protestant. They continue to grow faster than the national growth rate.

Orthodoxy
As of 2021, the Peruvian capital Lima was home to two Eastern Orthodox churches: one Greek and one Serbian. The Orthodox presence in Lima - which numbered roughly 350 in 2011 - is composed mostly of immigrants, but does include some Peruvian converts.

The Church of Jesus Christ of Latter-day Saints

The Church of Jesus Christ of Latter-day Saints claimed in 2022 slightly less than 620,000 members in Peru. However, the 2017 census found slightly under 114,000 people 12 or older who claimed to be members. Also, in 2022, Peru had 666 wards (large congregation) and 114 branches (small congregation) split among 112 stakes.

There are currently three LDS temples in Peru, one located in La Molina, Lima, another in Trujillo, and a third temple in Arequipa. At the April 3, 2016 General Conference of the LDS church, it was announced that a fourth temple would be built in Los Olivos, Lima. This second temple in Lima will make the city one of the few in the world with two temples.

Irreligion
Irreligion in Peru refers to atheism, agnosticism, deism, religious skepticism, secularism, and humanism in the Peruvian society.

According to the 2017 Peruvian Census data, 1,180,361 Peruvians or 5.1% of the population older than 12 years old describes themselves as being irreligious, but some sources put this number higher at 8.2%.

The irreligious population is predominantly urban (85.5% live in cities) and males (61.4% are male), and most are young people within the ages between 18 and 29 (40.4%). Only 11.8% of irreligious people are 50 years old or older.

Even though Peru is considered to be a Secular state, according to article 50 of the Peruvian Constitution the subject of Roman Catholicism is mandatory in Peruvian public schools. Many non-profit organizations promote the removal of the subject of Roman Catholicism in public schools, such as the Secular Humanist Society of Peru.

Other religions

Buddhism
Buddhism was introduced to Peru in 1899 when the ship Sakura Maru arrived at Callao, Peru, with 790 people from Japan. Japanese, Chinese, and Korean immigration to Peru during the 19th and 20th Century  brought Mahayana Buddhism to Peru, and followers of that style of Buddhism remain largely concentrated within those ethnic groups. While Mahayana remains the largest school of Buddhism in Peru, other schools such as the Diamond form have begun to spread so that Peru has more than 50,000 practicing Buddhists.

Baháʼí Faith

The Baháʼí Faith in Peru begins with references to Peru in Baháʼí literature as early as 1916, with the first Baháʼís visiting as early as 1919. A functioning community wasn't founded in Peru until the 1930s with the beginning of the arrival of coordinated Baháʼí pioneers from the United States which progressed into finding national Peruvian converts and achieved an independent national community in 1961. The Association of Religion Data Archives (relying mostly on the World Christian Encyclopedia) estimated some 41,300 Baháʼís in 2005.

Islam

The statistics for Islam in Peru estimate a total Muslim population  of 5,000, largely based in the capital of Lima, Peru; a number which has remained static since 1980.

Seax-Wica
Seax-Wica was introduced to Peru by Seax Gesith Ariel Phoenice, Witan of the Mimir's Well Seax Coven, Perú in 2001. Other covens were subsequently founded in Arequipa and Tacna.

Notes

References